Värmlands Folkblad ("Värmland's People's Paper") is a Swedish language daily newspaper released in Värmland, Sweden.

History and profile
Värmlands Folkblad was established in 1918. The paper has a social democratic political leaning. The present editor-in-chief is Peter Franke.

The circulation of the paper was 17,800 copies in 2011.

References

External links
 Official website

1918 establishments in Sweden
Mass media in Karlstad
Daily newspapers published in Sweden
Publications established in 1918
Swedish-language newspapers
Värmland